Jean-Michel Villaumé (born 24 March 1946 in Bavilliers, Territoire de Belfort) was a member of the National Assembly of France, representing Haute-Saône's 2nd constituency from 2007 to 2017, as a member of the Socialiste, radical, citoyen et divers gauche group.

References

1946 births
Living people
People from the Territoire de Belfort
Deputies of the 13th National Assembly of the French Fifth Republic
Deputies of the 14th National Assembly of the French Fifth Republic